Missionary Man may refer to:

"Missionary Man" (Eurythmics song), from 1986
Missionary Man (comics), a comic series written by Gordon Rennie
Missionary Man (film), a 2007 film by Dolph Lundgren

See also
Missionary (disambiguation)